Peter Lines (born 11 December 1969) is an English professional snooker player. He has reached the semi-finals of one ranking tournament, the 2018 Paul Hunter Classic. He reached his highest ranking, 42nd in the world, in 1999. He is the father of fellow professional snooker player Oliver Lines.

In January 2022, Lines won the 2022 UK Seniors Championship, part of the World Seniors Tour. In the same month, he was disciplined by the WPBSA for breaching conduct rules and bringing the game into disrepute. The sanction followed an incident at the 2021 Northern Ireland Open qualifiers, where Lines accused his opponent Xiao Guodong of cheating and challenged him to a fight.

Career
Lines turned professional in 1991, and in his debut season reached the last 32 stage twice, at the 1992 Strachan Open and the 1992 Asian Open. Wins were hard to come by for him during the next few seasons, although he qualifyied for the 1995 International Open, beating the likes of Fergal O'Brien and Doug Mountjoy in the process. Lines briefly fell off tour in 1997 but returned immediately via Qualifying School, and his results started to improve. 1997/98 season saw him reach the last 32 of the Welsh Open and Scottish Open before coming through qualifying for the World Championship to reach The Crucible for the first (and to date only) time in his career; there he was beaten 10–4 by John Parrott but not before compiling a 141 total clearance - the highest break by a debutant. As a result, he finished the season ranked 53, and rose to 42 after the next season despite having failed to reach another last 32.

Lines scored his best ever result at the 1999 China International as he sensationally defeated John Higgins and Peter Ebdon en route to his first career quarter-final, where he lost 4–5 to Brian Morgan.
Following this result, however, he started to struggle for form and to slip down the rankings, before an eventual relegation from the tour in 2004. He briefly regained his place in 2006 but was again relegated after another poor season.

Lines did not give up however, and thanks to working with coach Steve Prest had a successful 2007–08 season in the PIOS, where he won one event and reached the final of another to finish second in the top 8 qualifying for the main tour. He carried his fine form into the 2008–09 season as he performed consistently to finish in the top 64 and maintain his tour place. Better was to come during the next season, as Lines reached the last 64 of the Shanghai Masters and the last 48 of the Grand Prix, before a remarkable run in the UK Championship. He defeated Xiao Guodong, Ian McCulloch and Nigel Bond to qualify for the venue stages; there he convincingly beat Marco Fu 9–3, then caused an upset by edging out Mark Williams 9–8 to reach his second career quarter-final. Despite the 5–9 loss to Stephen Maguire, this performance could've allowed Lines to return to the top 48 of the world rankings, but another drop in form resulted in three opening round defeats in the remaining tournaments of the season to leave him ranked 50.

2010–11 season saw Lines recording a number of good results in the newly introduced minor-ranking PTC events, with three last 16 appearances and a quarter-final at the Event 5 to his name. However, his performances in the major tournaments were less successful, as aside from the UK Championship last 48 appearance he won only one more match; as a result he couldn't improve his ranking at the end of the season. Lines qualified for the 2011 UK Championship by defeating Ken Doherty 6–5 in round 4 of qualifying. He played Martin Gould in the last 32 and was beaten 6–2. Lines qualified for the 2013 German Masters by defeating John Higgins 5–3 in round 4 of qualifying. He played Ken Doherty in the last 32 and won 5–3, before losing 3–5 to Marco Fu in the last 16. In June 2014 he won the Pink Ribbon pro–am event defeating Lee Walker 4–1 in the final. Lines the Yorkshireman beat defending champion Neil Robertson on a run to the last 32 of the 2016 UK Championship. In March 2017 he won the World Seniors Championship defeating John Parrott 4–0 in the final. Lines regained full professional status for the 2017–18 season by coming through an EBSA playoff.  He defeated Zack Richardson 4–0 in the final round. He reached the last 16 on two occasions during the 2017/18 campaign, at the 2017 Paul Hunter Classic and the 2017 European Masters. During the 2019-2020 season Lines reached the last 16 of the 2020 Snooker Shoot Out. Lines famously has a 4-3 (excluding the Shoot-Out) winning head-to-head record against 4-time World Champion John Higgins.

On 7 January 2022, Lines won the UK Seniors Championship, defeating David Lilley 4–1 in the final.

On 13 January 2022, the WPBSA's disciplinary committee announced that it had fined Lines £2,500 and ordered him to pay costs of £5,464.80 for breaching conduct rules and bringing the game into disrepute. While playing Xiao Guodong at the 2021 Northern Ireland Open qualifiers in Leicester, Lines had become angry over what he regarded as the incorrect replacement of balls after referee Brendan Moore called a foul and a miss against his opponent. The committee heard that Lines confronted Xiao in the players' lounge after the match, accused him of cheating, swore at him, and challenged him to a fight, leading to security personnel removing Lines from the lounge. Lines apologised to Xiao shortly afterward, and the committee took his apology and his "unblemished career in snooker" into account when issuing its ruling.

Personal life
He is married to Sarah and has three children, Penny, Leo and Oliver. Both he and Oliver practise at the Northern Snooker Centre in Leeds.

Performance and rankings timeline

Career finals

Non-ranking finals: 4 (3 titles)

Pro-am finals: 7 (5 titles)

Amateur finals: 3 (1 title)

References

External links

Peter Lines at worldsnooker.com

Snooker players from Leeds
Living people
1969 births
World champions in snooker
English snooker players